Reveille is a historic mansion in Pulaski, Tennessee. It was built in 1868 for Benjamin Franklin Carter, a veteran of the Confederate States Army. It was designed in the Italianate architectural style. It has been listed on the National Register of Historic Places since October 28, 1994.

References

Houses on the National Register of Historic Places in Tennessee
Italianate architecture in Tennessee
Houses completed in 1868
Houses in Giles County, Tennessee